Patrick Wiegers (born 19 April 1990) is a German former professional footballer who played as a goalkeeper.

Career
Wiegers was born in Deggendorf.

He made his professional debut with SSV Jahn Regensburg during the 2009–10 3. Liga season in a 2–0 away loss to SpVgg Unterhaching. With the exception of the first 13 games of the 2013–2014 season, he was a bench player who only occasionally filled in for the main goalkeeper. His contract was not extended beyond the end of this season.

Following his departure from Regensburg, he joined Dynamo Dresden shortly after the start of the 2014–2015 season. After being the squad's reserve keeper for the first twenty games of the season, he was promoted to the starting eleven following the mid-game injury of Benjamin Kirsten on 13 December 2014 in a game against Energie Cottbus. On 26 April 2015, Kirsten returned to his old position after being subbed in due to Wiegers having received a red card. Apart from a brief five-game interval at the end of the 2015–2016 season, this has been Wieger's only stint as Dresden's main keeper so far, as he acted as the club's secondary or tertiary keeper during the following seasons.

References

External links
 
 

1990 births
Living people
People from Deggendorf (district)
Sportspeople from Lower Bavaria
German footballers
Footballers from Bavaria
Association football goalkeepers
2. Bundesliga players
3. Liga players
SSV Jahn Regensburg players
Dynamo Dresden players